AWS-1 may refer to:

Marine Air Control Squadron 1, a United States Marine Corps squadron, initially named Air Warning Squadron 1
A wireless telecommunications spectrum band; see List of AWS-1 devices
 An early search radar made by Plessey.